The Dean of Truro is the head (primus inter pares – first among equals) and chair of the chapter of canons, the ruling body of Truro Cathedral. The dean and chapter are based at the Cathedral Church of the Blessed Virgin Mary in Truro. The cathedral is the mother church of the Diocese of Truro and seat of the Bishop of Truro.

History of the Chapter
Upon the foundation of Truro Cathedral the bishop was authorised to establish honorary canonries which Dr, Benson did; these numbered 24. In 1878 a new act of Parliament authorised the bishop to establish residentiary canonries; in 1882 an existing canonry was transferred to Truro from Exeter whose income enabled the provision of two canonries at Truro. In 1906  the office of sub-dean was endowed; the bishop was also the dean (at least until 1925). This was the position until it became possible to fund the office of Dean.

List of deans

1895-1910 Cecil Bourke
1952-59 Joseph Fison
1960–81 Henry Lloyd
1982–97 David Shearlock
1998–2005 Michael Moxon
2005–11 Chris Hardwick (resigned)
August 20112012 Perran Gay (Acting)
22 September 2012September 2022 (ret.) Roger Bush (retired end of September 2022)

References

Deans of Truro
Deans of Truro
 
Deans of Truro